The University of the Philippines Visayas Tacloban College (UPVTC) is a satellite college that is part of the University of the Philippines Visayas. It was established on May 23, 1973, at the city of Tacloban, Philippines.

History
In its 833rd meeting, the University of the Philippines (UP) Board of Regents established the UP College Tacloban. It was recognized as a regional unit of the System on May 23, 1973 and inaugurated on July 2, 1973.

Ten years later, Executive Order No. 4 placed UP College Tacloban under the administrative supervision of University of the Philippines Visayas.

A new campus will be constructed in Barangay Santa Elena in Tacloban City after the Department of Budget and Management (DBM) approved the funding for the construction of the access road from the national highway to the campus site recently.

On November 8, 2013, the college sustained severe damage and lost one employee and four of its students due to Typhoon Yolanda. Due to the extent of the damage incurred by the college, its students were forced to enroll in other University of the Philippines campuses such as UP Cebu. University of the Philippines Visayas sent cash aid to support UP Tacloban's faculty members a few days after the typhoon hit.

Admissions

UP College Admission Test (UPCAT) 
Admission into the University of the Philippines' undergraduate programs is very competitive, with over 100,000 students taking the exam every year, with about 11,000 being accepted. To maintain its high standard of education and to maximize its limited resources, UP has had to limit slots for undergraduate admission to each campus and to its various degree programs by means of qualification through the University of the Philippines College Admission Test (UPCAT).

Organization

UPV Tacloban College (UPVTC) is divided into four academic divisions:

Division of Humanities
Division of Management
Division of Natural Sciences and Mathematics
Division of Social Sciences
The college is also home to three research and public service offices: the Leyte Samar Heritage Center (LSHC), the Regional Environmental Information Systems (REIS), and the Office of Continuing Education and Pahinungod (OCEP).

Academic programs
The college's BS Accountancy, BS Biology, BS Management and BS Computer Science programs are currently the best in Region 8. The college's BA Communication Arts program is the finest in the Visayan archipelago in terms of Speech, Literature and Theater Arts. The BA Psychology program has also been recently recognized in the Psychological Association of the Philippines-Junior Affiliates (PAPJA) and is considered one of the top performing schools in the Psychometrician Board Exam in recent years.

Undergraduate
 Bachelor of Arts in Communication Arts
 Bachelor of Arts in Psychology
 Bachelor of Arts (Economics)
 Bachelor of Arts (Social Sciences) Political Science
 Bachelor of Science in Accountancy
 Bachelor of Science (Biology)
 Bachelor of Science in Computer Science
 Bachelor of Science (Management)
 Bachelor of Science in Applied Mathematics (starting academic year 2022–2023)

Graduate
 Master of Management (Business Management)
 Master of Management (Public Management)
 Master of Science (Environmental Science)

Student life

Student Body
The Student Body is autonomous student body and has a student council subject only to the express will of the students. There are more than 2000 students currently enrolled and has 48 student organizations. All bona fide undergraduate students of the UPV Tacloban College are considered members of the UPV Tacloban College student body.

Student Council 
It is considered independent and need not to be recognized by the Office of the Student  Affairs. The selection of its officers is annual via students' election.

Student organizations 
There are 48 college recognized organizations, which includes academic program-specific organizations (e.g. JPIA, JPMAP, Politikons, Psych Circle, EcoSoc, InterSoc, Biosoc, and Ideopraxist) geological-based organizations (e.g. OrSiCUP, KAISSA, HINGYAP, etc.), socio-civic (UP Halcyon, UP Runggiyan, etc.), interests (Animo, Amplify UP, etc.), fraternities and sororities, (TGP, TOM, APO), political parties (PULSO Han Mag-aaram, KALAYAAN Lihok Mag-aaram, etc.), and others. Student organizations are formed by students with common interests and has its own constitutions, rules and activities. Student organizations will only be considered by the college of it complies with and abides by the rules set by the university and by the college.

References

University of the Philippines Visayas
State universities and colleges in the Philippines
Universities and colleges in Tacloban
Universities and colleges in Leyte (province)